Car accessory socket may refer to:

 Cigarette lighter receptacle
 ISO 4165